Ryan Potter (born September 12, 1995) is an American actor. He made his acting debut as the lead of the Nickelodeon action comedy series Supah Ninjas (2011–2013). As a voice actor, he voiced Hiro Hamada in the animated superhero film Big Hero 6 (2014), its television series sequel (2017–2021) and the Disney+ series Baymax! (2022). Potter also portrays Gar Logan / Beast Boy on the DC Universe / HBO Max superhero series Titans (2018–2023).

Early life
Potter was born in Portland, Oregon on September 12, 1995. His mother, Jordanna Potter-Lew, is Jewish American and his father is Japanese. He uses his mother's maiden name. He was raised in Tokyo, Japan, until returning to the United States when he was seven. He was raised by his single mother. Potter's first language was Japanese; however, he is no longer fluent. At the age of eight, he began studying White Tiger kung fu, a discipline which he would continue to pursue throughout his teenage years. Other childhood interests reportedly included baseball, skateboarding, and playing the drums.

His stepfather is martial artist and stunt legend James Lew.

Career
In 2010, Potter began his acting career at the age of 15 when he received a leaflet in his kung fu class announcing Nickelodeon was looking for teenagers to star in a new martial-arts themed program entitled Supah Ninjas. After a few days of considering an acting career, Potter decided to audition, eventually landing the series' lead role of Mike Fukanaga, a typical American teen who discovers he is a descendant from a long line of ninjas. In March 2012, Nickelodeon announced it had renewed Supah Ninjas for a second season.

Following the premiere of Supah Ninjas in January 2011, he became one of Nickelodeon's popular young stars, featured in numerous teen magazines and making personal appearances in the network's special Nickelodeon's Worldwide Day of Play and its reboot of Figure It Out, as well as an appearance on its sister network's broadcast of the 2011 TeenNick HALO Awards. In March 2012, Potter began a recurring role on Fred: The Show, portraying Fred's best friend.

Potter later voiced Big Hero 6 protagonist Hiro Hamada and reprised his role in the animated series based on the film and Kingdom Hearts III.

Potter was also lobbying for the role of Tim Drake and created a concept fight scene using the character's signature bō staff as an audition. He ended the video with a plea to Ben Affleck to cast him as Robin. He was then cast as Beast Boy (or Garfield "Gar" Logan) in Warner Bros.'s live-action Titans series.

Since 2020, he has been the voice of wealthy camper Kenji Kon in Jurassic World: Camp Cretaceous.

Advocacy
In 2011, Potter founded the organization Toy Box of Hope, a charity which holds an annual holiday collection drive for children in homeless shelters and transitional living facilities in the Los Angeles area. During the second annual event in 2012, Potter spoke of the focus of the organization, stating "[W]hat we want to do is provide bedsheets, jackets and toys to [homeless shelters], so these kids are like, 'Wow, someone cares, there's hope.'" In 2012, Potter was reportedly planning to expand Toy Box of Hope to include a "Birthday Party Box" program.

In June 2012, Potter became one of the youngest celebrities to lend his voice to California's No H8 Campaign in support of same-sex marriage. When explaining his involvement, 16-year-old Potter stated, "I know what it feels like to be bullied. And I will not tolerate the thought of anyone, for any reason, being bullied. It starts with young people, and it can end with young people. As we learn to embrace our diversity, we become stronger, more tolerant. The differences are beautiful. The differences matter. It's what makes life an adventure."

Filmography

Film

Television

Web series and music videos

Audio

Video games

References

External links
 
 Ryan Potter at TV Guide
 
 

1995 births
Living people
American male child actors
American male television actors
American male voice actors
American martial artists
American people of English descent
American people of German descent
American people of Russian-Jewish descent
American people of Swedish descent
American people of Ukrainian-Jewish descent
American male actors of Japanese descent
Jewish American male actors
American expatriates in Japan
American LGBT rights activists
Male actors from Portland, Oregon
21st-century American male actors
21st-century American Jews